Monticelli may refer to:

Places in Italy 
Municipalities (comuni)
 Monticelli Brusati, in the Province of Brescia 
 Monticelli d'Ongina, in the Province of Piacenza 
 Monticelli Pavese, in the Province of Pavia 
 Monte San Biagio, in the province of Latina, named Monticelli until 1862

Civil parishes (frazioni)
 Monticelli (Ascoli Piceno), a quarter of Ascoli Piceno
 Monticelli (Esperia), in the municipality of Esperia (FR)
 Monticelli (Florence), a quarter of Florence
 Monticelli (Mercato San Severino), in the municipality of Mercato San Severino (SA) 
 Monticelli (Olevano sul Tusciano), in the municipality of Olevano sul Tusciano (SA) 
 Monticelli (Ostuni), in the municipality of Ostuni (BR)
 Monticelli (Teramo), in the municipality of Teramo
 Monticelli Terme, in the municipality of Montechiarugolo (PR)

Other uses 
 Monticelli (surname)

See also 
 Monticello (disambiguation)